The First Federal Basketball League's scoring title in Yugoslavia was awarded to the player with the highest points per game average in a given season.

Key

Scoring leaders
Source

See also 
 Yugoslav First Federal Basketball League career stats leaders
 ABA League Top Scorer

Notes

References and notes

First Federal Basketball League
YUBA
Basketball